Medical education in France is administered by the Unités de formation et de recherche de médecine (UFR). The training takes a minimum of nine years after the baccalauréat and concludes with a thesis. Upon the successful presentation of their thesis, the medical student is awarded a diplôme d'études spécialisées (DES), based on their specialty. Certain high-achievers are awarded a diplôme d'études spécialisées complémentaire (DESC).

French medical training is one of the longest schooling paths in French higher education. It consists of both theoretical and practical training, with a gradual shift from theory at the beginning, to more practical aspects as training progresses.

Medical students in France are traditionally known as carabin (riflemen) because the uniforms of military medical students resemble those of Italian riflemen.

History

18th century
Under the Ancien Régime, medicine was one of four faculties and generally only accessible through the Faculté des Arts de Paris. Teaching was mostly theoretical and involved lectures and readings from authorities. Practical components were gradually introduced in the 18th century. Until the French Revolution in 1789, doctors and surgeons were considered to be separate professions. Surgeons were known as barber surgeons.

The university system was abolished in 1793 and replaced the following year by four medical schools in Paris, Montpellier, Bordeaux and Strasbourg. With the creation of the Imperial University in 1808, medical schools reopened their faculties and expanded across France.

19th century
In the 19th century, new practical training schools were established in response to the rapid technical evolution of medicine and the mediocrity of university theoretical teaching. Acceptance into these practical training programs was restricted and highly sought after, as hospitals were synonymous with the elite. Medical students began neglecting their faculty examinations to prepare for these practical training entrance examinations and it was possible that upon completing their studies, they had not seen a single patient.

20th century
Hospital reforms in 1958 merged the teaching functions of hospitals and universities, creating the position of University Professor and Hospital Practitioner (Professeur des universités – Praticien hospitalier, PUPH). One goal of the reforms was to reduce the number of graduates moving to private practice.

Following the events of the May 1968 protests in France, practical training entrance restrictions were removed: all medical students received practical training. Practical and theoretical training were finally combined into a single course, based on the 1958 ideal of the Centre Hospitalier Universitaire. Following the Faure reform, medical colleges were integrated into universities as UER (from 1984, research and teaching centres "UFR").

This reform, along with the general population increase, led to a large surge in student numbers. In 1971 this resulted in a fixed number of training places in exams at the end of the first year of medical studies.

Until the 1990s, any doctor could become a specialist, either by taking the selective hospital residential pathway, or by taking the open access university pathway resulting in a lower-status certificate of specialized studies (THESE). The result was a two-speed medical system, divided between THESE graduates and “former interns” and “former senior hospital registrars”. A reform dropped the THESE medical certificates, returning to obligatory internships for the “ordinal qualification” specialists, through diplomas of specialized studies (OF) to supplement the diploma of Doctor of Medicine. Interns were required to spend part of their training in a non-academic “peripheral hospital” belonging to a regional hospital centre (CHR).

Recent changes
Until 2004, future general practitioners did not take entrance exams for internships. Their second cycle was followed by a two and a half year “résidanat” (three years for residents starting in or after 2001). In 2004, a new reform was applied, stating that all medical students must pass the national classifying examination. The résidanat was replaced with an internship in general medicine, helping to raise the status of general practice as a profession.

Since the 2010 academic year, the medical first year course was organized as common first year of healthcare studies with pharmacy, dentistry and midwifery. This year was commonly viewed as "very difficult".

This system changed in 2019 via a major reform into a hybrid model. On the one hand, students can still access a second year in healthcare studies via a modified version of the traditional first year model (parcours accès santé - PASS). In doing so, they have to choose a minor in another subject in which they can continue, should they fail the selection process into the second year. On the other hand, universities now offer undergraduate degrees (licence accès santé - LAS) in many subjects that include a minor in healthcare, allowing them to take the selective exams that grant access to the second year of healthcare studies.

Organization
Medical studies proceed in three cycles within a university having a unit of "formation" and medical research (sometimes a combination of medicine and pharmacology), associated with one of the 29 university hospitals. Their total duration varies from nine years (general medicine) to 12 years (another speciality plus a sub-speciality).

First cycle of medical studies
The first cycle of medical studies (in summary PCEM) takes two years, with a "concours" (competitive final exam) at the end of the first year selecting students admitted to continue medical or dental studies.

National law specifies that the instruction of the first cycle and the first year of the second cycle must include the following disciplines or disciplinary units:
physics, biophysics, and image processing;
chemistry, biochemistry, cellular, and molecular biology;
anatomy, embryology, developmental, and reproductive biology;
cytology, histology, and pathological anatomy;
bacteriology, virology, and parasitology;
fundamental hematology, immunology, and oncology;
genetics and biotechnologies;
physiology and nutrition;
pharmacology and major classes of drugs;
epidemiology and biostatistics;
clinical and biological semiotics and medical imagery terminology;
first aid;
demography, health economics, and health systems.

Teaching must also include foreign languages, epistemology, psychology, medical ethics and deontology.

First year (until 2009)
The first year academic cycle for medical students is common with dentistry and midwifery.

Requirements during the first year include: physics, biophysics, chemistry, biochemistry and molecular biology, cellular biology, physiology, anatomy, histology, and embryology.

First year (since 2010)
The first year of the studies of health (ex-PACES, currently called PASS) is common to the medical studies, dental, pharmaceutical and midwife (sometimes also kinesitherapy). It is divided into two six-month periods.

To be allowed to be registered in first year of the studies of health, the candidates must have one of the following qualifications:
a baccalaureate degree;
a diploma of "access to academic works";
a French diploma or foreign diploma that can be considered equivalent to the baccalaureat pursuant to the national regulation;
a qualification or an achievement considered to be sufficient.

As for any formation of system LMD, the year is divided in two six-month periods and “units of teaching” (EU) which are seen allotting a certain number of appropriations ECTS.

In first half of the year, the lesson is common to all the fields. Tests are organized at the end of this one; the badly classified students can be reorientated in other university fields.

With the second half-year, the students choose one or of the EU specific (S) to a field, in addition to the common formation. The students pass a competition at the end of the year leading to four classifications.

The first year may only be repeated once. The grade is final if the student fails to pass twice.

Second year
The second year (in summary PCEM 2 or P2) begins with four weeks of obligatory and non-remunerated nurse placement. It takes place during the holidays preceding the re-entry by the students admitted in second year of medicine or odontology.

Lastly, a more medical matter, the semiotics, traditionally taught in third year, is at the present time transferred in second year in most universities, in order to improve the range of the clinical training courses of second and third years (usually called “training courses of checklist” or “training course of semiotics”).

The first cycle of the medical studies follows a national plan, but the organization between the two years varies between the universities. In the same way, there exist three types of teaching:
linear teaching: each matter is taught separately (anatomy, histology, biophysics, etc.). This type of teaching does not require great coordination between the professors, but it can lead to great redundancies, even with contradictions.
integrated teaching: the students have modules gathering of the lesson of various disciplines around the same apparatus. For example, a module of neurosciences includes/understands the anatomy and the histology of the nervous system, sensory biophysics and the neurobiochimy. The student follows then a cardiopulmonary module, a digestive module, etc.
coeducation: certain aspects are presented in integrated teaching, others in linear teaching.

Second cycle of medical studies

In four years, the student receives a formal and practical training on the various pathologies segmented in modules: transverse modules (more or less interdisciplinary) or modules of body. These modules are the classifying official program of the national examination (see low), and include a numbered list of items which correspond either to pathologies, or with clinical or therapeutic situations.

Third year of medicine
The third year of medicine (in summary DCEM 1 or D1) is a year of transition where the student learns bioclinical sciences (pharmacology, bacteriology, virology, parasitology, etc.) which make the interface between fundamental sciences of the first cycle and lesson of pathology. They also learn how to carry out the anamnèse (medical history) and the clinical examination of a patient at the time of their clinical training courses (called “training courses of checklists”, because the clinical examination linear and is structured, with boxes which one notches) associated with teaching with semiology. They start with the first modules.

Certain universities start the hospital training courses in third year, the clinical training course of second year is then developed further.

This year is particularly compatible with Erasmus exchanges.

Externship
The three following years constitute the “externat”. This term of everyday usage (which is a survival of the old contest of the externat removed following the demonstrations of 1968) does not officially exist. The official texts and the internal texts of the CHU and the universities speak about “hospital students”, because the students are remunerated by the hospital complex to which the university is attached. They are paid under limited time contract, attached to a social security office.

The student, under the responsibility for an intern (nonofficial) or of a senior (senior registrar or hospital practitioner), learn how to recognize the various signs of a disease. The student at this stage does not have therapeutic responsibility, nor the right to prescribe. The student is however responsible for his acts (civil responsibility, which requires the subscription of a suitable insurance).

The externat generally consists of four training courses per year, three months in each specialty service, chosen by grids at the beginning of each year or quarter, either by classification with the merit, or by alphabetical classification. The training courses consist of five mornings per week in the services. Certain training courses are obligatory from the statutory texts (pediatrics, obstetric gynaecology surgery, internal medicine and emergency medicine.), and can then integrate theoretical teaching (the student is present at the hospital all the day). Conversely, certain services do not have the external ones, that depends on the agreements made with the university.

Certain universities replaced the half-time (mornings) permanent by one full-time by alternation: the external ones are then present all the day but only 6 weeks over 3 months, the 6 remaining weeks being devoted to the lesson, the examinations, the preparation of the ECN…

During the externat, lecturing, is replaced more and more by directed work; the lectures are held in alternation with hospital training courses: this teaching is that of a true trade-guild, where the external one approaches by “clinical cases” of true situations lived in the services.

The external one must, during its three years of externat, to carry out 36 sessions of 12, 18, or 24 hours (according to the service and the day of the week), that is to say approximately a session per month, remunerated 26 euros rough.

The remuneration of the training courses is as for it “symbolic system” (approximate remuneration: 122 euros per month in fourth year, 237 euros in fifth year, 265 euros in sixth year), but the external student has the statute of a paid worker and contributes to the paid mode of social security, and the pension fund. The pension fund complementary to external is the IRCANTEC, as it is the case for the interns and the hospital practitioners. The external ones, like any employee, have five weeks of paid vacations.

Since 2004, the second cycle of the medical studies is sanctioned by a diploma (recognized in the European Union). Module 11 of the second cycle is the old certificate of clinical and therapeutic, essential synthesis to replace a general doctor.

Third cycle of the medical studies
Students able to reach the third cycle of medical studies (TCEM):
have completed the second cycle of the medical studies in France;
are amenable to the European state or Community, Swiss Confederation, Principality Member States of Andorra left to the agreement on European Economic Area, others that France, holders of a diploma of end of second cycle of the medical studies or of an equivalent title from one of these states.

Classifying national tests
Tests are organized for the candidates quoted above.

According to its classification, the student chooses his university hospital (and thus the city) of assignment. This choice is carried out initially by Internet (phase of pre-choice and simulations), the final choice taking place during a “amphitheatre of garrison” which brings together all the students by sections of classification. This procedure makes it possible the student to choose his station by being informed fully of the places available.

The 11 existing fields in 2008 are, with the number of places available, or 5704 places on the whole:

General medicine: 3200 stations
Medical specialties: 885 stations
Surgical specialties: 550 stations
Psychiatry: 280 stations
Anaesthesia-reanimation: 260 stations
Pediatric: 200 stations
Gynecology-obstetrics: 155 stations
Public health: 60 stations
Medical biology: 40 stations
Occupational medicine: 54 stations
Medical gynaecology: 20 stations

In 2005, a thousand places were not filled, certain students preferring to retry rather than to choose a speciality by default.

Hospital training

Although they have the statute of student and a supervision, an intern is an autonomous professional, since they can prescribe and carry out replacements in liberal cabinets (provided they have on validated a certain number of six-month periods, and obtained a “licence of replacement” from the departmental council of doctors). They act more than one initial track records that real studies (more especially as France is one of the rare countries to regard the interns as students). They are paid employees.

Training in general medicine lasts three years, and is validated when all the six month training courses necessary have been carried out (diploma of specialized studies of general medicine) and it is followed by submitting a medical thesis. It consists of six month training courses during which time they are remunerated, associated with a hospital, but also associated with a general doctor, or of an extra-hospital structure of care. The student takes complete charge of their patients, but still under the responsibility of a “senior” (see supra): this includes clinical examination, regulation of complementary examinations and treatment. Teaching is primarily practical at this stage.

Speciality training lasts four years or more. Depending on the speciality chosen, the student must take a minimum number of training courses in hospital services where their role is similar to the paid trainees in general medicine described above. The training is complete when the candidate has done each of the mandatory six month training courses. It also requires a medical thesis generally relating to a topic of the chosen speciality, generally in the last year of training . The speciality is sanctioned by the diploma of specialized studies, after defence of a report, which is sometimes confused with the thesis (thesis-report, when this one is constant in the last year of training and relates to a subject of the speciality).

The diploma of State of doctor of medicine is conferred after defence successfully thesis of exercise.

Registrarship and assistantship
For certain specialities, in particular surgery, additional training is required: either at a university clinic for two to four years, or a specialty assistantship for at least 1 year. The total training for these specialities therefore ranges from 12 to 15 years.

See also
French education system, Higher learning in France, University in France
General medicine
Medicine
Medical education by country category
Medical school
Physician

References

Bibliography

 
Educational institutions in France
Higher education in France
Universities and colleges in France